Yell Extreme Park, is the first adventure park in Armenia. It is in Tavush Province, in the village of Yenokavan. It is a two-hour drive (142 km) north of Yerevan, the capital of Armenia, and two and a half from Tbilisi, the capital of Georgia. It is a few kilometers north of the regional capital of Ijevan.

Yell Extreme Park is the first adventure park in Armenia where one can try extreme sports without being a professional. The first flight by the zip-line was done in 2015. Now there are many other activities besides zip-line, including mountain biking, horseback riding, etc. In 2016 people opened the Rope Park.

In the park there is a rest area, where people can rest, eat something, play games like Chess, Monopoly, Risk, Uno, Settlers of Catan, Dungeons and Dragons, Go and much more.

The founder of Yell Extreme Park is Tigran Chibukhchian, whose purpose is to develop extreme tourism and to become a great center of extreme tourism in the region.

Activities 
Eight activities are available in the park:

 Zip-line 
 Paragliding
 Rope Park
 Off-road
 Via ferrata
 Rock climbing
 Paintball
 Horseback riding

References

Adventure parks
Tourist attractions in Tavush Province